The 2012 Barnsley Metropolitan Borough Council election took place on 3 May 2012 to elect members of Barnsley Metropolitan Borough Council in South Yorkshire, England. One third of the council will be up for election.

Overall Results

+/- figure compared to 2011 result.

Ward Results

Central Ward

Cudworth Ward

Darfield Ward

Darton East Ward

Darton West Ward

Dearne North Ward

Dearne South Ward

Dodworth Ward

Hoyland Milton Ward

Kingstone Ward

Monk Bretton Ward

North East Ward

Old Town Ward

Penistone East Ward

Penistone West Ward

Rockingham Ward

Royston Ward

St Helen's Ward

Stairfoot Ward

Wombwell Ward

Worsbrough Ward

By-elections between 2012 and 2014

References

2012 English local elections
2012
2010s in South Yorkshire